Cara Black and Liezel Huber were the defending champions. Both were present that year, but chose to compete with different players.
Black partnered with Anastasia Rodionova but lost 6–4, 6–4 in quarterfinals against Gisela Dulko and Flavia Pennetta. Huber partnered with Nadia Petrova but lost 7–5, 6–2 in semifinals against Lisa Raymond and Rennae Stubbs.Victoria Azarenka and Maria Kirilenko won 7–6(7–4), 7–6(7–8) in the final against Lisa Raymond and Rennae Stubbs.

Seeds
The top four seeds receive a bye into the second round.

Draw

Finals

Top half

Bottom half

External links
 Main draw

Women's Open - Doubles